The Wild Nation (original French title: La Fête Sauvage) is a 1976 French wildlife documentary film directed by Frédéric Rossif. The film focuses in showing wildlife according to three main themes: love, death and dream.

Description 
Filmed at a great distance, The Wild Nation features various animals species in several locations, without any human interaction. Frédéric Rossif wanted to film the spontaneity and lack of reflection that takes part in the animals' lives.

Sometimes three narrators describe the animals and their behavior, relating them to mythology and how the animals' lives are influenced by love and death. The narrators' presence is rare, with most of the film showing the animals alone accompanied by music specially created for it.

Re-Release 
In 2014 the movie was restored and re-released by Zoroastre with the support of Studio Canal.

Soundtrack 
The movie soundtrack was composed by Vangelis. It was released as an album in 1976.

References

Documentary films about animals
Documentary films about nature
French documentary films
1976 documentary films
1976 films
Films scored by Vangelis
1970s French films
1970s French-language films